The 2014–15 Cal State Northridge Matadors women's basketball team represented California State University, Northridge during the 2014–15 NCAA Division I women's basketball season. The Matadors, led by fourth-year head coach Jason Flowers, played their games at the Matadome as members of the Big West Conference.

Previous season 

The Matadors finished the season 18–14 overall (12–4 in Big West), and won both the Big West regular season and conference tournament. They were eliminated in the first round of the NCAA tournament with a 58–73 loss to South Carolina.

Roster

Schedule 

|-
!colspan=9 style=| Exhibition

|-
!colspan=9 style=| Regular season

|-
!colspan=9 style=| Big West tournament

|-
!colspan=9 style=| NCAA Women's Tournament

References 

2014–15 NCAA Division I women's basketball season
Cal State Northridge Matadors women's basketball seasons
2014 in sports in California
2015 in sports in California
2015 NCAA Division I women's basketball tournament participants